Bloomington may refer to:

Places

U.S.A. (most commonly)
Bloomington, Illinois
Bloomington, Indiana
Bloomington, Minnesota

U.S.A. (less commonly)
Bloomington, California
Bloomington, Idaho
Bloomington, Kansas
Bloomington, Maryland
Bloomington, Missouri
Bloomington, Nebraska
Bloomington, New York
Bloomington, Ohio
Bloomington, South Dakota
Bloomington, Texas
Bloomington, Utah
Bloomington (Louisa, Virginia), a historic house
Bloomington, Wisconsin
Bloomington (town), Wisconsin
Bloomington Township, McLean County, Illinois
Bloomington Township, Indiana
Bloomington Township, Decatur County, Iowa
Bloomington Township, Muscatine County, Iowa
Bloomington Township, Kansas
Bloomington Township, Minnesota
Bloomington Township, Missouri
New Bloomington, Ohio

Canada
Bloomington, Nova Scotia
Bloomington, Stormont-Dundas-Glengarry, Ontario
Bloomington, York Region, Ontario

Other 
 Bloomington (album), a 1993 Branford Marsalis live album
 Bloomington (film), a 2010 film

See also
 Bloomington Thunder (disambiguation)